A Roman Orgy, also known as Heliogabalus, is a 1911 French short historical drama film directed by Louis Feuillade for Société des Etablissements L. Gaumont. It features Jean Aymé as the lecherous Emperor Elagabalus (Heliogabalus) who sets a pack of lions on his guests. It also stars Louise Lagrange, Luitz-Morat, Renée Carl, Edmond Bréon, and Léonce Perret. The film was released on 24 November 1911. The Dutch Film Museum has a copy of the film.

References

External links
 
 

1911 films
1910s historical films
1911 short films
Cultural depictions of Elagabalus
Films directed by Louis Feuillade
Films set in the 3rd century
Films set in the Roman Empire
French historical films
French silent short films
Articles containing video clips
French black-and-white films
1910s French films